Elba is an island in the Mediterranean Sea off the coast of Tuscany, Italy. 

Elba may also refer to:

Places

In the United States
 Elba, Alabama, a city and county seat
 Elba, Idaho, an unincorporated community
 Elba, Illinois, an unincorporated community
 Elba, Minnesota, a city
 Elba, Nebraska, a village
 Elba, New York, a town
 Elba (village), New York, within the town
 Elba, Ohio, an unincorporated community
 Elba, Washtenaw County, Michigan, a historic settlement
 Elba, Wisconsin, a town
 Elba Island (Georgia)
 Elba Island (Michigan)
 Elba Township (disambiguation)

Elsewhere
 Gabal Elba or Elba Mountain, Egypt
 Principality of Elba, a short-lived non-hereditary monarchy ruled by Napoleon 
 Elbe River (in Hungarian: Elba), in the Czech Republic and Germany

People with the name
 Idris Elba (born 1972), English-Sierra Leonian actor
 Elba Esther Gordillo (born 1945), Mexican politician
 Elba Lightfoot (born 1910), African-American painter and muralist
 Elba Ramalho (born 1951), Brazilian singer
 Elba Serrano, Puerto Rican neuroscientist
 Elba Vergés (born 1995), Spanish footballer
 nickname of Elbasan Rashani (born 1993), Swedish footballer

Other uses
East London Business Alliance, a corporate social responsibility charity in London, UK
Elba DOC, a wine made from grapes grown on the island of Elba
, a warship of the Italian Navy
 Fiat Elba, a car produced by Fiat
 Elba, a cookware manufacturer based in Treviso, Italy, now a subsidiary of Fisher & Paykel

See also
 North Elba, New York

Feminine given names